Schönenberg is a German surname meaning beautiful mountain.

Notable people
Notable people with this surname include:
 Georg von Schönenberg (1530–1595), Prince-Bishop of Worms
 Johann von Schönenberg (1525–1599), Archbishop-Elector of Trier
 Tobias Schönenberg (born 1986), German actor